Events in the year 1882 in Germany.

Incumbents

National level
 Kaiser – William I
 Chancellor – Otto von Bismarck

State level

Kingdoms
 King of Bavaria – Ludwig II of Bavaria
 King of Prussia – Kaiser William I
 King of Saxony – Albert of Saxony
 King of Württemberg – Charles I of Württemberg

Grand Duchies
 Grand Duke of Baden – Frederick I
 Grand Duke of Hesse – Louis IV
 Grand Duke of Mecklenburg-Schwerin – Frederick Francis II
 Grand Duke of Mecklenburg-Strelitz – Frederick William
 Grand Duke of Oldenburg – Peter II
 Grand Duke of Saxe-Weimar-Eisenach – Charles Alexander

Principalities
 Schaumburg-Lippe – Adolf I, Prince of Schaumburg-Lippe
 Schwarzburg-Rudolstadt – George Albert, Prince of Schwarzburg-Rudolstadt
 Schwarzburg-Sondershausen – Charles Gonthier, Prince of Schwarzburg-Sondershausen
 Principality of Lippe – Woldemar, Prince of Lippe
 Reuss Elder Line – Heinrich XXII, Prince Reuss of Greiz
 Reuss Younger Line – Heinrich XIV, Prince Reuss Younger Line
 Waldeck and Pyrmont – George Victor, Prince of Waldeck and Pyrmont

Duchies
 Duke of Anhalt – Frederick I, Duke of Anhalt
 Duke of Brunswick – William, Duke of Brunswick
 Duke of Saxe-Altenburg – Ernst I, Duke of Saxe-Altenburg
 Duke of Saxe-Coburg and Gotha – Ernst II, Duke of Saxe-Coburg and Gotha
 Duke of Saxe-Meiningen – Georg II, Duke of Saxe-Meiningen

Events
 24 March – the Tuberculosis bacillus causing tuberculosis, M. tuberculosis, was identified and described by Robert Koch.
 28 March – German company Beiersdorf was founded.
 29 April – the Electromote was the world's first vehicle run like a trolleybus, which was first presented to the public on April 29, 1882, by its inventor Ernst Werner von Siemens in Halensee, a suburb of Berlin, Germany.
 20 May – Triple Alliance
 23 June – Kiel Week in Kiel started.

Births

Deaths

References

 
Years of the 19th century in Germany